Nam June Paik Art Center is an art gallery in Giheung-gu, Yongin, in the Seoul Capital Area, South Korea. It opened in 2008 and hosts both permanent and temporary exhibitions. It is named after the Korean American artist Nam June Paik, whose work is included in its permanent collection.

The gallery awards the Nam June Paik Art Center Prize.

Details

Nam June Paik Art Center Prize
The Nam June Paik Art Center Prize was established in 2009. It is "awarded to artists and theorists whose works are . . . amalgamating art and technology, pursuing new ways of communication, interacting with audiences, and fusing and conflating music, performance and visual art." The prize includes a solo exhibition at the Center.

Recipients
2009: Lee Seung-taek, Eun-Me Ahn, Ceal Floyer, and Robert Adrian
2010: Bruno Latour
2012: Doug Aitken
2014: Haroon Mirza
2016: Blast Theory
2018: Trevor Paglen
2020: CAMP

References

2008 establishments in South Korea
Art galleries established in 2008
Art museums and galleries in Seoul
Contemporary art galleries in Asia
Museums devoted to one artist
Biographical museums in South Korea